The Lithuanian National Road Race Championships have been held since 1997.

Men

U23

Women

See also
Lithuanian National Time Trial Championships
National Road Cycling Championships

References

National road cycling championships
Cycle racing in Lithuania
Recurring sporting events established in 1997
1997 establishments in Lithuania
National championships in Lithuania